Buparvaquone is a naphthoquinone antiprotozoal drug related to atovaquone. It is a promising compound for the therapy and prophylaxis of all forms of theileriosis. Buparvaquone has been shown to have anti-leishmanial activity in vitro. It can be used to treat bovine East Coast fever protozoa in vitro, along with the only other substance known – Peganum harmala. It is the only really effective commercial therapeutic product against bovine theileriosis, where it has been used since the late 1980s.

Industrial production 
It was first produced in Great Britain, then in Germany. Its patent expired in the mid-2000s, and was then produced in different countries, e.g., India and Iran.

Use in bovine theileriosis 
Using a single dose of 2,5 mg/kg, the recovery rate of curable cases is 90 to 98%.  In tropical theileriosis, a dosage of 2.0 mg/kg has the same efficacy. Body temperature returns to normal in two to five days.
Parasitemia lowers from 12% on day 0 to 5% the next day, then to 1% by day 5 and none at day 7.

Molecular target 
Buparvaquone resistance appears to be associated with parasite mutations in the Qo quinone-binding site of mitochondrial cytochrome b. Its mode of action is thus likely to be similar to that of the antimalarial drug atovaquone, a similar 2-hydroxy-1,4-naphthoquinone that binds to the Qo site of cytochrome b thus inhibiting Coenzyme Q – cytochrome c reductase.

References 

Antiprotozoal agents